The 1965 Toledo Rockets football team was an American football team that represented Toledo University in the Mid-American Conference (MAC) during the 1965 NCAA University Division football season. In their third season under head coach Frank Lauterbur, the Rockets compiled a 5–5 record (2–4 against MAC opponents), tied for fifth place in the MAC, and outscored all opponents by a combined total of 104 to 96.

The team's statistical leaders included John Schneider with 598 passing yards, Jim Berkey with 440 rushing yards, and Henry Burch with 325 receiving yards.

Schedule

References

Toledo
Toledo Rockets football seasons
Toledo Rockets football